Gonzalo Rodriguez-Pereyra (born 7 August 1969) is a philosopher. He is currently a lecturer at the University of Oxford, where he has the title of Professor of Metaphysics, and a Tutorial Fellow at Oriel College.

Rodriguez-Pereyra has previously been a Research Fellow at Churchill College, University of Cambridge, Lecturer at the University of Edinburgh, Lecturer at the University of Oxford and Tutorial Fellow at Hertford College, and Professor at the University of Nottingham and Universidad Torcuato Di Tella.

His interests are primarily in Metaphysics and the philosophy of Leibniz. His work on resemblance nominalism provides a response to that of David Malet Armstrong and grounds resemblance relations in the sort of modal realism expressed in On the Plurality of Worlds by David Lewis.

Selected publications

Books
Resemblance Nominalism: A Solution to the Problem of Universals. Oxford: Oxford University Press, 2002. 
Real Metaphysics: Essays in honour of D. H. Mellor (co-edited with Hallvard Lillehammer). London: Routledge, 2003. 
Leibniz's Principle of Identity of Indiscernibles. Oxford: Oxford University Press, 2014.

Articles
'Leibniz's argument for the Principle of Identity of Indiscernibles in Primary Truths', in M. Carrara, A.-M. Nunziante, and G. Tomasi (eds.) Individuals, Minds and Bodies: Themes from Leibniz, Stuttgart : Steiner, 2004, pp. 49–59.
'Truthmaking and the Slingshot', in U. Meixner (Ed.), Metaphysics in the Post-Metaphysical Age, Wien: Verlag Hölder-Pichler-Tempsky, 2001.
'What is the Problem of Universals?', Mind, vol. 109 (April 2000), pp. 255–273.

References

External links
Personal Page at the Oxford University

1969 births
Living people
British philosophers
Academics of the University of Edinburgh
Academics of the University of Nottingham
Fellows of Oriel College, Oxford
Place of birth missing (living people)
Metaphysicians